The Women's 50 Butterfly event at the 11th FINA World Aquatics Championships swam 29 – 30 July 2005 in Montreal, Canada. Preliminary and Semifinals heats were held on 29 July.  The Final was held on 30 July.

At the start of the event, the existing World (WR) and Championships (CR) records were:
WR: 25.57 swum by Anna-Karin Kammerling (Sweden) on 30 July 2002 in Berlin, Germany
CR: 25.84 swum by Inge de Bruijn (Netherlands) on 26 July 2003 in Barcelona, Spain

Results

Preliminaries

Swim-off for 16th place
 Vasilisa Vladykina (Russia) -- 27.14
 Aleksandra Urbanczyk (Poland) -- 27.22

Semifinals

Final

References

Swimming at the 2005 World Aquatics Championships
2005 in women's swimming